The L.B. Menefee House is a house located in the Portland Heights neighborhood of Portland, Oregon designed by prominent architect John Virginius Bennes. The house is registered on the National Register for Historic Places. The house was originally designated to house the archbishop of the Roman Catholic Archdiocese of Portland, Oregon.

See also
 National Register of Historic Places listings in Southwest Portland, Oregon

References
 

1900 establishments in Oregon
Houses on the National Register of Historic Places in Portland, Oregon
Tudor Revival architecture in Oregon
Southwest Hills, Portland, Oregon